Wilmot is an unincorporated community in Cowley County, Kansas, United States.

History
A post office was opened in Wilmot in 1879, and remained in operation until it was closed in 1957.

Education
The community is served by Central USD 462 public school district.

References

Further reading

External links
 Cowley County maps: Current, Historic, KDOT

Unincorporated communities in Cowley County, Kansas
Unincorporated communities in Kansas